Miss World Iceland (originally Miss Iceland), is a national beauty pageant in Iceland. The winner of this contest represents Iceland at Miss World.

History
The competition has been carried out since 1950; in the first year it was called Miss Reykjavík (Ungfrú Reykjavík). Since 1955, the contest has taken place under the current name Miss Iceland. In the past, contest winners gained the right to represent Iceland in Miss Universe, Miss World or Miss International. As of 2009, the winner goes on to compete in Miss World. There are six regional preliminary contests in each of the five rural regions and in the capital Reykjavík. 20 to 24 candidates, three to four from each region, take part in the finals.

Iceland is one of the most successful countries at the Miss World pageant with three victories, a record for a nation with a population of less than half a million people.

In 2018, the organizers abandoned the Ungfrú Ísland (Miss Iceland) brand in order to adopt a new format for Miss World and created Miss World Iceland.

In 2019, former Miss World of 1988, Linda Pétursdóttir, became the license holder for Miss World Iceland and is now in charge of organizing the contest.

2013 applicants
Rafn Rafnsson, the new chief executive of the Miss Iceland contest, "in hopes of diversifying the field of contestants beyond the statuesque blonde with striking blue eyes that has become the Icelandic stereotype", said "There is no Miss Iceland stereotype..." One week later, in response to Rafnsson's statement, 1,300 people applied to become Miss Iceland, including several nontraditional candidates, such as:

 Sigríður Guðmarsdóttir, 48, a female governmental minister in Reykjavik
 Reynir Sigurðbjörnsson, 47, a male electrician
 Ása Richardsdóttir, a 49-year-old female producer in the fine arts industry
 Matthildur Helgadóttir-Jónudóttir, a female event manager also in her 40s 
 Brynhildur Heiðardóttir Ómarsdóttir, a female literary critic
 Sigríður Ingibjörg Ingadóttir, a female Member of Parliament for the Social Democratic Alliance
 Guðrún Jónsdóttir, a spokesperson for Stígamót (organization that fights sexual abuse against women)
 Hildur Lillendahl, a feminist in Iceland
 Björk Vilhelmsdóttir, a city councilor of Reykjavík and feminist
 Þórdís Elva Þorvaldsdóttir, a writer and actress

In response to the increase of nontraditional applicants, Rafnsson said, "We have to follow the rules set by the international contest." This "means rejecting any applicants younger than 18 or older than 24. In addition to the age limits, contestants must be unmarried, childless and, of course, female." Íris Telma Jonsdóttir, Iceland's 2012 Miss World contestant, "has the unfortunate job of sifting through applications for the coming Miss Iceland contest and the publicity stirred by feminists has even sparked an abnormally high influx of legitimate hopefuls. That means she has a lot more reading to do before selecting the field of 25 women who will actually compete for a chance to move on to Miss World."

Titleholders

2018-present
 Winning International Title

Miss Iceland for Miss World

2018-present
 
Beginning in 2018, the winner of Miss World Iceland of will compete for Miss World.

Ungfrú Ísland 1955-2017

 Ungfrú Ísland winners between 1955 and 2017 competed at Miss World pageant.

Notes
 Unnur Steinsson was Miss Iceland 1983 and finished in the top five positions at the Miss World finals the same year. She is the mother of Unnur Birna Vilhjálmsdóttir who won the Miss Iceland pageant in 2005 and became Miss World 2005. Steinsson was three months pregnant when she carried Unnur and competed in the 1983 contest, which was strictly forbidden and could have led to disqualification. Her daughter, Unnur, as mentioned, won the pageant 22 years later.
 In 2011, Guðlaug Dagmar Jónasdóttir won second place and Sigríður Dagbjört Ásgeirsdóttir won third place.

References

External links
 Website for License Holder
 Official Miss World Iceland
 Miss World Iceland

Iceland
Beauty pageants in Iceland
Recurring events established in 1950
1950 establishments in Iceland
Icelandic awards